Jeanne Evelyn Davidson (born 1953) is an attorney in the United States Department of Justice and is a former nominee to be a United States Judge of the United States Court of International Trade.

Biography

Davidson was born in 1953, in Whittier, California. She received an Artium Baccalaureus degree in 1976 from the University of California at Berkeley. She received a Juris Doctor in 1980 from the New York University School of Law. She began her legal career as an associate at the law firm of Steptoe & Johnson, from 1980 to 1986. From 1992 to 1993, she served as Associate General Counsel in the Office of the United States Trade Representative. For more than twenty five years, she served in the National Courts Section of the Commercial Litigation Branch in the Civil Division of the United States Department of Justice, serving in various roles including as Director from 2007 to 2013. She is currently the Director of the Offices of Foreign Litigation and International Legal Assistance as well as the International Trade Field Office in the Commercial Litigation Branch of the Civil Division. She also currently serves as President of the Federal Circuit Bar Association.

Expired nomination to trade court

On August 18, 2014, President Obama announced his intention to nominate Davidson to serve as a United States Judge of the United States Court of International Trade, to the seat vacated by Judge Donald C. Pogue, who took senior status on July 1, 2014. President Obama officially sent Davidson's nomination to the Senate on September 8, 2014. She received a hearing  before the United States Senate Committee on the Judiciary on September 17, 2014. On November 20, 2014 her nomination was reported out of committee by voice vote. On December 16, 2014 her nomination was returned to the President due to the sine die adjournment of the Senate. On January 7, 2015, President Obama renominated her to the same position and on February 5, 2015, she was again reported to the floor by voice vote. Her nomination expired on January 3, 2017, with the end of the 114th Congress.

References

Living people
New York University School of Law alumni
University of California, Berkeley alumni
Lawyers from Washington, D.C.
1953 births
People from Whittier, California